A canonical cover  for F (a set of functional dependencies on a relation scheme) is a set of dependencies such that F logically implies all dependencies in , and  logically implies all dependencies in F.

The set  has two important properties:
 No functional dependency in  contains an extraneous attribute.

Algorithm for computing a canonical cover 

 
 Repeat:
 ... until  does not change

Canonical cover example 
In the following example, Fc is the canonical cover of F.

Given the following, we can find the canonical cover: R = (A, B, C, G, H, I) F = {A→BC, B→C, A→B, AB→C}

 {A→BC, B→C, A→B, AB→C}
 {A → BC, B →C, AB → C}
 {A → BC, B → C}
 {A → B, B →C}

Fc =  {A → B, B →C}

Extraneous Attributes 
An attribute is extraneous in a functional dependency if its removal from that functional dependency does not alter the closure of any attributes.

Extraneous Determinant Attributes 

For example:

 If F = {A → C, AB → C}, B is extraneous in AB → C because A → C can be inferred even after deleting B. This is true because if A functionally determines C, then AB also functionally determines C.
 If F = {A → D, D → C, AB → C}, B is extraneous in AB → C because {A → D, D → C, AB → C} logically implies A → C.

Extraneous Dependent Attributes 

A dependent attribute of a functional dependency is extraneous if we can remove it without changing the closure of the set of determinant attributes in that functional dependency.

For example:

 If F = {A → C, AB → CD}, C is extraneous in AB → CD because AB → C can be inferred even after deleting C.
 If F = {A → BC, B → C}, C is extraneous in A → BC because A → C can be inferred even after deleting C.

References 

Database theory
Mathematical concepts
Database algorithms